was a town located in Kimotsuki District, Kagoshima Prefecture, Japan.

As of 2003, the town had an estimated population of 14,441 and a density of 112.15 persons per km². The total area was 128.76 km².

On July 1, 2005, Kōyama, along with the town of Uchinoura (also from Kimotsuki District), was merged to create the town of Kimotsuki.

External links
 Official website of Kimotsuki 

Dissolved municipalities of Kagoshima Prefecture